Bhala Pae Tate 100 Ru 100 is a 2015 Indian Odia language action comedy film directed by Sudhanshu Sahu. Babushan and Sheetal Patra play the lead roles in the film. The movie is a remake of 2007 Kannada movie Krishna.

Plot
An orphan named Babushan, who works as TV anchor in one of the most popular shows on Sarthak TV, lives in rent with Hari. All goes well for Babushan until he rejects the advances of his landlord's daughter; the reasons for his actions become clear as this story unfolds.

Cast
 Babushan as Babushan
 Sheetal
 Suryamayee Mahapatra as Suramayee
 Harihara Mahapatra
 Prutiviraj Nayak
 Amit Pani
 Debashis Parta
 Pupul Bhuyan

Box office 
The film did a good business in theatres across Odisha and declared as Hit.It was well received by the Audience and given positive reviews from critics.

Soundtrack

Release
Bhala Pae Tate 100 ru 100 was released during Durga Puja on 18 October 2015.

References

External links
 

2015 films
Odia remakes of Kannada films
2010s Odia-language films
Odia remakes of Tamil films
Films directed by Sudhanshu Sahu